Jeffrey Alan Smith II (born April 21, 1997) is an American football wide receiver for the New York Giants of the National Football League (NFL). He played college football at Boston College.

Early life and high school
Smith grew up in St. Petersburg, Florida and attended Clearwater Central Catholic High School, where he played high school football. He was the Marauders starting quarterback. As a senior, he passed for 2,165 yards, rushed for 1,236 yards, and accounted for 34 total touchdowns.

College career
Smith was a member of the Boston College Eagles for four seasons from 2015 to 2018. As a true freshman, he started the final three games of the season at quarterback following an injury to starter Darius Wade. He completed 27 of 82 passes for 253 yards with two touchdowns and three interceptions while rushing for 454 yards and 6 touchdowns in five total games played. He moved to wide receiver before his sophomore year and finished the season with 27 receptions for 395 yards and 3 touchdowns while also rushing for 199 yards and a touchdown. As a junior, Smith caught 25 passes for 296 yards while rushing for 107 yards and a touchdown and also throwing for two touchdowns on trick plays. Smith had 20 catches for 387 yards and six touchdowns, rushed for 142 yards and a touchdown, and passed for 67 yards and a touchdown in his senior season. He finished his collegiate career with 73 receptions for 1,116 yards and 10 touchdowns, 906 rushing yards and nine touchdowns on 143 carries, and completed 34 passes for 404 yards, six touchdowns and three interceptions.

Professional career

New York Jets
Smith signed with the New York Jets as an undrafted free agent on April 27, 2019. He was cut at the end of training camp during final roster cuts, but was re-signed by the Jets to their practice squad on September 1, 2019. The Jets promoted Smith to the Jets active roster on December 9, 2019. Smith made his NFL debut on December 12, 2019 against the Baltimore Ravens, catching one pass for 12 yards. He was placed on injured reserve on December 17, 2019.

On September 7, 2020, Smith was placed on injured reserve. He was activated on October 1, 2020 prior to Week 4.

Smith signed an exclusive-rights free agent tender with the Jets on April 19, 2021.

New York Giants
On March 17, 2023, Smith signed a one-year contract with the New York Giants.

References

External links
Boston College Eagles bio
New York Jets bio

1997 births
Living people
Boston College Eagles football players
American football wide receivers

New York Jets players
New York Giants players
Players of American football from St. Petersburg, Florida
American football quarterbacks
People from Clearwater, Florida